Akdam is a village in the District of Kozan, Adana Province, Turkey. As of 2011, it had a population of 1196 people.

References

Villages in Kozan District